The 2010–11 season was Forfar Athletic's first season back in the Scottish Second Division, having been promoted from the Scottish Third Division at the end of the 2009–10 season. Forfar Athletic also competed in the Challenge Cup, League Cup and the Scottish Cup.

Summary
Peterhead finished third in the Second Division, entering the play-offs losing 7–4 to Ayr United on aggregate and remained in the Second Division. They reached the Quarter-final of the Challenge Cup, the second round of the League Cup and the third round of the Scottish Cup.

Results and fixtures

Scottish Second Division

First Division play-offs

Scottish Challenge Cup

Scottish League Cup

Scottish Cup

Player statistics

Squad 

|}

League table

Notes
Note1.  Forfar Athletic received a random bye to the second round.
Note2.  Includes other competitive competitions, including Challenge Cup and First Division play-offs

References

Forfar Athletic F.C. seasons
Forfar Athletic